Contepec is a municipality in the Mexican state of Michoacán, located  east of the state capital of Morelia.

Geography
It borders the Michoacano municipalities of Epitacio Huerta to the northwest, Maravatío to the west, and Tlalpujahua to the southwest, as well as the municipalities of Amealco de Bonfil in Querétaro to the northeast, and Temascalcingo and El Oro de Hidalgo of the State of Mexico to the east and southeast.

Farmland covers 64% of Contepec. The mountains on the municipality's eastern border with Temascalcingo are protected as the Altamirano unit of the Monarch Butterfly Biosphere Reserve, a UNESCO World Heritage Site.

Tepuxtepec Dam is located on the Lerma River which flows through the northern and western part of Contepec. Built from 1926 to 1950, the dam and its reservoir are used for hydroelectricity generation, flood control and irrigation.

Contepec's climate is temperate with rain in the summer.

History
The place name Contepec derives from Nahuatl comitl, pot, and tepetl, "hill". In pre-Hispanic times the area was inhabited by Guamare and Pame indigenous peoples: epidemics caused their extinction in the area by the end of the 16th century. The area was repopulated in the 17th century by Otomi and Mazahua settlers.

In the first half of the 19th century Contepec was part of the municipality of Coroneo in Guanajuato. In 1857 it was separated from Guanajuato and incorporated as a municipality in Michoacán. Between 1935 and 1938 the municipal seat was located at Tepuxtepec. In 1962 the municipality of Epitacio Huerta was separated from Contepec.

Administration
The municipal government comprises a president, a councillor (Spanish: síndico), and seven trustees (regidores), four elected by relative majority and three by proportional representation. The current president of the municipality is Ruben Rodríguez Jiménez.

Demographics
In the 2010 Mexican Census, the municipality of Contepec recorded a population of 32,954 inhabitants living in 7723 households. The 2015 Intercensal Survey estimated a population of 34,193 inhabitants in Contepec.

There are 74 localities in the municipality, of which only the municipal seat, also known as Contepec, is classified as urban. It recorded a population of 4184 inhabitants in the 2010 Census.

Economy
The main economic activities in Contepec are agriculture and livestock farming.

References

Municipalities of Michoacán
1857 establishments in Mexico
States and territories established in 1857